ASL Airlines France operates scheduled, charter and cargo flights to a wide range of destinations. The list below contains the main destinations:

Africa

Algeria
Algiers – Houari Boumediene Airport
Annaba – Rabah-Bitat Airport
Chlef - Chlef International Airport
Constantine - Mohammed Boudiaf airport
Béjaïa - Abane Ramdane airport
Oran - Ahmed Ben Bella Airport
Cape Verde
Sal Island – Amilcar Cabral International Airport charter
Boa Vista - Aristides Pereira International Airport charter
 Morocco
 Oujda - Angads Airport

Asia
Israel
Eilat – Ovda Airport charter
Tel Aviv – Ben Gurion International Airport

Europe
Belgium
Brussels – Brussels Airport (on behalf of Brussels Airlines)
Cyprus
Paphos – Paphos International Airport charter
Finland
Kittilä – Kittilä Airport charter
France
Ajaccio – Ajaccio - Campo dell'Oro Airport cargo
Bastia – Bastia – Poretta Airport cargo
Bordeaux – Bordeaux–Mérignac Airport
Brest – Brest Bretagne Airport cargo
Clermont-Ferrand – Clermont-Ferrand Auvergne Airport cargo
Dole – Dole–Jura Airport cargo
Grenoble – Grenoble–Isère Airport
Limoges – Limoges – Bellegarde Airport cargo
Lyon – Saint Exupéry Airport
Marseille – Marseille Provence Airport
Montpellier – Montpellier – Méditerranée Airport cargo
Nice – Nice Côte d'Azur Airport cargo
Paris – Paris-Charles de Gaulle base
Pau - Pau Pyrénées Airport
Rennes – Rennes–Saint-Jacques Airport cargo
Strasbourg – Strasbourg International Airport cargo
Toulouse – Toulouse–Blagnac Airport cargo
Italy
Naples – Naples International Airport charter
Spain
Seville – San Pablo Airport charter

North America
France
Saint-Pierre – Saint-Pierre Airport seasonal on behalf of Air Saint-Pierre

External links 
Official site

References 

Lists of airline destinations
France transport-related lists